The Religion of Man is a 1931 compilation of lectures by Rabindranath Tagore, edited by him and drawn largely from his Hibbert Lectures given at Oxford University in May 1930. A Brahmo playwright and poet of global renown, Tagore deals with largely universal themes of God, divine experience, illumination, and spirituality. A brief conversation between him and Albert Einstein, "Note on the Nature of Reality", is included as an appendix.

Another compilation of three lectures on roughly the same set of subjects, delivered in 1933 as his Kamala Lectures at the University of Calcutta, was published in Bengali under the same name.k1

Contents of the Hibbert Lectures
Preface
I. Man's Universe
II. The Creative Spirit
III. The Surplus In Man
IV. Spiritual Union
V. The Prophet
VI. The Vision
VII. The Man of My Heart
VIII. The Music Maker
IX. The Artist
X. Man's Nature
XI. The Meeting
XII. The Teacher
XIII. Spiritual Freedom
XIV. The Four Stages Of Life
XV. Conclusion

Appendix:
I. The Baul Singers of Bengal
II. Note on the Nature of Reality
III. Dadu and the Mystery of Form
IV. Night and Morning

Index

References

Further reading

External links
 Full text on Archive.org

Philosophical literature
Philosophy of religion literature
1931 non-fiction books
Works by Rabindranath Tagore
Books of lectures